Association Sportive de Choisy-le-Roi is a football club based in Choisy-le-Roi, France. It competes in the Régional 2 Paris Île-de-France, the seventh tier of the French football pyramid. The club's colours are light blue and white.

History 
Founded as SC Choisy-le-Roi in 1905, the club's best performance in the Coupe de France was in the 1991–92 edition of the tournament, when the team reached the round of 64 before being eliminated by Nîmes after a 2–0 loss. Dominique Bathenay coached Choisy-le-Roi from 1990 to 1994. In 1994, the club was renamed to AS Choisy-le-Roi. In the 2003–04 season, ASCR notably played in the Championnat de France Amateur, the fourth tier in France.

Honours

Notable players 

 Claude Anelka
 Check Oumar Diakité
 Djibril Diani
 Édouard Duplan
 Dominique Lokoli
 David Lollia
 Andreas Manga
 Allan Nyom
 Jacques Siwe
 Moussa Traoré
 Philippe Troussier
 Fabien Valéri
 Lenny Vallier

References 

AS Choisy-le-Roi
Association football clubs established in 1905
1905 establishments in France
Sport in Val-de-Marne
Football clubs in Paris